Vasily Chapayev was a Project 1134A Berkut A (NATO reporting name: 'Kresta II') class cruiser of the Soviet Navy named for Soviet commander Vasily Chapayev. The ninth ship of the class, the vessel was launched in 1974 and served during the Cold War with the Pacific Fleet. Based at Vladivostok, the ship travelled extensively in the Indian and Pacific Oceans, visiting a large number of friendly ports in Angola, Ethiopia, India, Mozambique and Yemen. In 1978 and 1979, the vessel formed part of a Soviet flotilla, including the Project 68bis cruiser (NATO reporting name: 'Sverdlov' class) , that supported Vietnam in the aftermath of the Sino-Vietnamese War. In 1982, Vasily Chapayev was allocated to support the BOR-4 spaceplane programme, and in 1984 participated in a major Soviet search for a US Navy submarine near the Kamchatka Peninsula. In 1985, the ship took part in a simulated joint operations attack on the US base at Pearl Harbor and, during the following year, the first joint exercises between the Soviet and North Korean Navies. Taken out of active service in 1992, Vasily Chapayev was decommissioned and transferred to be broken up in 1993.

Design and development 

Vasily Chapayev was the ninth ship of the class of ten Project 1134A Berkut A (NATO reporting name: 'Kresta II'-class) cruisers, designed by Vasily Anikeyev. The class were designated as large anti-submarine ships (Russian: Большой Противолодочный Корабль, BPK) in accordance with their primary mission of countering NATO ballistic missile submarines, particularly the US Navy fleet of Polaris-equipped submarines. However, before the ships began to be built, commander-in-chief of the Soviet Navy Admiral Sergey Gorshkov changed the role of the ships to that of destroying NATO attack submarines to allow Soviet Project 667A Navaga (NATO reporting name: 'Yankee'-class) ballistic missile submarines to reach the central Atlantic and Pacific, from where the latter could launch their comparatively short-ranged ballistic missiles against targets in the United States.

Displacement was  standard and  full load. The ship's complement was 343 officers and ratings. A hangar was fitted aft capable of handling a single Kamov Ka-25 (NATO reporting name: 'Hormone-A') helicopter.

Vasily Chapayev was propelled by two TV-12-1 geared steam turbines each powered by four high-pressure boilers, with the forward engine room powering the port screw and the aft the starboard.

Armament 
As the ship's primary role was as an anti-submarine warship, Vasily Chapayev mounted two KT-106 quadruple launchers for eight 85R anti-submarine missiles in the URPK-3 Metel system (NATO reporting name: SS-N-14 'Silex'). This was backed up by two stern RBU-6000 12-barrel and two forward RBU-1000 6-barrel rocket launchers to protect against close-in threats. The Ka-25 helicopter embarked on the ship was also capable of aiding in the search and destruction of submarines, and as such could carry depth charges and torpedoes. The 85R missiles could also be used against surface threats.

For defence against aerial threats, Vasily Chapayev was armed with the M-11 Shtorm system (NATO reporting name: SA-N-3 'Goblet'), which included two twin B-187A launchers, one forward of the bridge and the other forward of the hangar, for 48 V-611 (4K60) surface-to-air missiles in two barrel-shaped magazines of 24 missiles each. The vessel also had four AK-725  dual-purpose guns situated in two twin mountings, one on either side aft of the funnel, to protect against surface and aerial threats. Although not envisaged in the original design, four AK-630 sextuple  close-in weapon systems were added during construction. Two quintuple PT-53-1134A mountings for  torpedoes were also fitted aft of the funnel which could be used in both the anti-shipping and anti-submarine role.

Sensors and electronics warfare 
Vasily Chapayev was equipped with the MR-600 Voskhod (NATO reporting name: 'Top Sail') early-warning radar, supported by a MR-310A Angara-A (NATO reporting name: 'Head Net C') search radar, and two Volga (NATO reporting names: 'Don Kay' and 'Don-2') navigational radars. The improved MG-332T Titan-2T hull-mounted sonar was fitted in a bulbous radome for anti-submarine warfare. This was complemented by the radar, dipping sonar and sonobuoys that could be carried by the onboard helicopter. For fire-control purposes the vessel had Grom-M for the surface-to-air missiles, MR-103 Bars for the AK-725 and MR-123 Vympel for the AK-630.

The ship's electronic warfare equipment included the MRP-15-16 Zaliv and two sets each of the MRP-11-12 and MRP-13-14 direction-finding systems, as well as the MRP-150 Gurzuf A and MRP-152 Gurzuf B radar-jamming devices. Vasily Chapayev was also fitted with a MG-26 communications outfit and a MG-35 Shtil passive sonar.

Construction and career

Construction 
Ordered on 11 June 1970 from the Zhdanov Shipyard Vasily Chapayev, allocated the yard number 729, was laid down on 22 November 1973 and launched on 28 November 1974. Vasily Chapayev was named in honour of the Soviet Civil War commander Vasily Chapayev. The vessel was completed on 30 November 1976. Commissioned under the command of Captain 2nd Rank  V. A. Sobgaida, the vessel was assigned to the Soviet Navy's Pacific Fleet.

1970s 
On entering service, Vasily Chapayev was ordered to sail on 24 December 1976 but the crew refused to comply. When the rebellion was assessed by the authorities, the senior officers were found culpable and removed. Captain 1st Rank A. A. Agadzhanov was transferred from Vladivostok to take command and the warship departed Leningrad in 1977 for the port that would be home for the rest of the ship's career. On 16 December 1977, the ship paid a visit to Mumbai, staying until 21 December. On 31 March the following year, Vasily Chapayev was allocated to the 201st Brigade of the 10th Squadron of the Pacific Fleet based at Vladivostok. The vessel subsequently visited Aden in the People's Democratic Republic of Yemen, Cienfuegos and Havana in Cuba, and Luanda, Angola, to contribute to friendly relationships between the host countries and the Soviet Union. The ship arrived in Vladivostok the following year, the first major warship to join the Pacific Fleet in four years and seen by NATO as a demonstration of the increasing importance of the region to Soviet policy.

In June 1978,Vasily Chapayev joined a fleet of Soviet warships, including the Project 68bis (NATO reporting name: 'Sverdlov' class) cruiser  and the Project 58 (NATO reporting name: 'Kynda' class) cruiser , in sailing to Vietnam to promote peace after the Sino-Vietnamese War. In February 1979, the vessels returned to support Vietnam during the border clashes with China that followed the conflict. The crew was honoured for their service, with 36 receiving government commendations. The vessel returned in March.

1980s and end of service 
Vasily Chapayev started the next decade in Vladivostok. In 1982, the ship was seconded to the search team under the Black Sea Fleet supporting the BOR-4 spaceplane, which was designed to splashdown in the Indian Ocean. The vessel spent the year visiting countries in and around the ocean. Between 8 and 12 May 1982, the crew were hosted by Victoria, Seychelles. The ship then travelled on to Ethiopia, where short preventative maintenance repairs were performed, and then subsequently travelled to Maputo, Mozambique, and Socatra, Yemen, before returning to Vladivostok via Victoria and Vietnam. The ship underwent a more substantial overhaul in 1983.

On 28 September 1984, the ship left Vladivostok as part of a large fleet of Soviet vessels led by the Project 1143 Krechyet (NATO reporting name: 'Kiev' class) aircraft carrier  on a mission to search for a US Navy nuclear submarine off the coast of the Kamchatka Peninsula. Two days later, on 30 September, a radioactive signature consistent with a submarine was detected and on 2 October, the Soviet Project 877 Paltus (NATO reporting name: 'Kilo' class) class submarine B-404 identified a US submarine in the Kuril Strait. The submarine was subsequently tracked by air and sea until 5 October. The Project 1134B Berkut B (NATO reporting name: 'Kara' class) cruiser  and Vasily Chapayev acted as motherships for the operation, and on 5 October refuelled the smaller vessels of the flotilla in Aniva Bay. The ships then all returned to port.

After a short anti-submarine exercise in February, on 29 March 1985, Vasily Chapayev accompanied Nikolayev, Novorossiysk and a host of smaller vessels under the command of Vice-Admiral Rostislav Leonidovich Dymov to the Pacific Ocean undertake a major exercise to test the joint operations capability of the Soviet armed forces. The fleet progressed to the coast of Hawaii, and proceeded to run a simulated attack on Pearl Habor. The test proved the value of a co-ordinated attack by aircraft, ships and submarines using long-range cruise missiles. The fleet then proceeded to the Philippine Sea and undertook anti-submarine operations to identify the US Navy ballistic missile submarines that operated in the area. September found the vessel off the coast of Vietnam undertaking further weapon tests. The voyage was considered a success.

Between 15 and 17 October 1986, the ship was involved in the first joint exercise between the Soviet Union and the Korean People's Navy, simulating an amphibious attack on Rason. The crew was subsequently named amongst the most capable in the Soviet Navy at anti-submarine warfare. However, over the following years, the amount of activity that the vessel saw decreased substantially. With the end of the Cold War and the dissolution of the Soviet Union in 1991, the navy reassessed its need for a large fleet and decided to retire some of its larger and more expensive ships. The class of warships was to be transferred to the Russian Navy. However, on 5 March 1992, the Vasily Chapayev was removed from active service. On 30 June 1993, the vessel was struck, decommissioned and transferred to be broken up, a process that started on 31 December.

During the vessel's career, Vasily Chapayev was assigned the temporary tactical numbers 545, 570, 239, 511, 549 and 590.

References

Citations

Bibliography

External links 
  Vasily Chapayev photographs on navsource.narod.ru
  Vasily Chapayev photo album on kresta-ii.ucoz.ru

1974 ships
Cold War cruisers of the Soviet Union
Kresta II-class cruisers
Ships built at Severnaya Verf
Cold War ships